Bairia is a constituency of the Uttar Pradesh Legislative Assembly covering the city of Bairia in the Ballia district of Uttar Pradesh, India.
Bairia is one of five assembly constituencies in the Lok Sabha constituency of Ballia. Since 2008, this assembly constituency is numbered 363 amongst 403 constituencies.

Election results

2022

2017
Bharatiya Janta Party candidate Surendra Nath Singh won in last Assembly election of 2017 Uttar Pradesh Legislative Elections defeating Samajwadi Party candidate Jai Prakash Anchal by a margin of 17,077 votes.

Members of Legislative Assembly

References

External links
 

Assembly constituencies of Uttar Pradesh
Ballia district